Venezuelan may refer to:
 Something of, from, or related to the country of Venezuela
 Venezuelan Spanish, the dialect of Spanish spoken in Venezuela
 Venezuelan cuisine
 Something of, from, or related to Venezuela, Cuba, a city in Cuba

See also
Venezuela (disambiguation)
Lists of Venezuelans

Language and nationality disambiguation pages